Takahiro Shiomi (塩見 貴洋, born September 6, 1988 in Moriguchi, Osaka) is a Japanese professional baseball pitcher for the Tohoku Rakuten Golden Eagles in Japan's Nippon Professional Baseball.

External links

NPB stats

1988 births
Living people
Baseball people from Osaka Prefecture
Japanese baseball players
Nippon Professional Baseball pitchers
Tohoku Rakuten Golden Eagles players
People from Moriguchi, Osaka